ColdBox is a free, open-source, conventions-based, modular web application framework intended for building enterprise applications with ColdFusion (CFML) using a Hierarchical MVC approach.

It is a set of tools and methodologies that can allow a developer to build their web applications in a modern and secure way.  It also provides them with a scaffold on which to base their applications. As a result, they don’t have to reinvent the wheel on most concerns they have to consider when building web applications. The framework gives developers the proper tooling to do their job quickly, securely, modularly, and flexibly.

The source code of ColdBox and its companion libraries are hosted on GitHub and licensed under the terms of the Apache License v2.

History 
ColdBox was developed and created by Luis F. Majano in 2006, and it has become the most widely used and maintained MVC framework. Given its speed and scalability, ColdBox evolved into a performant and simple framework that empowered developers. It became a professional open source project in 2008 when professional services were offered by the parent company Ortus Solutions, Corp. Later, in 2011, the Hierarchical Model View Controller was set as its core foundation design pattern. In the last few years, it introduced tight integration to Java's CompletableFuture API to support Futures and Promises and asynchronous/parallel programming. The latest release is version 6.8.1 (August 11, 2022).

Capabilities 

 A HMVC web framework for the ColdFusion platform.
 Modular development platform to provide HMVC architectural patterns
 Conventions over configurations (No XML)
 Integrates with Hibernate ColdFusion ORM
 Offers a consistent framework aiming to reduce confusion and be easy to learn
 Persistence abstraction layers (caching)
 Built-in logging library
 Built-in dependency injection and AOP capabilities
 Internal Domain Specific Languages to define caching, DI/AOP, logging, and mocking
 Ability to do unit and integration testing
 Ajax support which is easy to extend and customize
 RESTful and SOAP web service support
 Adobe Flex/Air integration and monitoring
 Provides multi-development environment capabilities
 Prolific Documentation
 Integrates natively with Java's CompletableFuture API to support futures and promises.

Platforms 
ColdBox is supported on Lucee (A popular open-source CFML engine) and Adobe's ColdFusion application servers. It has supported IDE plugins for Visual Studio Code, Sublime Text, Eclipse IDE, and Adobe ColdFusion Builder.

ColdBox Universe 
The ColdBox Platform comprises several internal standalone libraries that can be used with any CFML Framework or none at all. Its library includes: 

LogBox - Logging Library
 WireBox - Dependency Injection and AOP library
 CacheBox - Caching Engine and Aggregator
TestBox - Testing framework for ColdFusion

Usage 
Below is a list of some notable users of the Coldbox Platform.
 Adobe
 Esri
 FAA
 GE
 Kennedy Space Center
 NASA JPL
 Railo
 Lucee
 L'Oréal
 US Airforce
 US Navy
 Success Academy Charter Schools
 American Youth Soccer Organization
 Los Angeles County Museum of Art

Installation 
Getting started is easy with ColdBox, WireBox, CacheBox, or LogBox in any ColdFusion (CFML) application since just CommandBox, the CLI, and the package manager should be leveraged. These commands run from the CommandBox interactive shell.

Controllers 
ColdBox is a conventions-based framework programmed in CFML, differing from other CFML MVC frameworks that use XML declarative logic for their controllers.

Below is an example of a controller:
component{

	// Use Dependency injection for hibernate-based virtual services
	property name="userService" inject="entityservice:User";
	
	/**
	* Return immediate HTML
	*/
	function sayHello(event){
	 	return "hello";
	}

	/**
	* Return immediate JSON from an ORM object's memento
	*/
	function sayHello(event){
	 	return userService.get( rc.id ).getMemento();
	}
	
	/**
	* Return content in multiple formats
	*/
	function list(event){
		prc.data = userService.list();
	 	// render out all users in json format
		event.renderData( data=prc.data, formats="json,xml,pdf,html" );
	}
}

URL mappings 
ColdBox supports URL mappings and routing in Rails style but is adapted for ColdFusion.  It also supports the creation of RESTful routing:

// Resources 
resource( "photos" );

// Nested Resources
resources(
	resource 	= "agents",
	pattern 	= "/sites/:id/agents"
);

// Redirects
route( "/oldRoute" )
	.toRedirect( "/main/redirectTest" );

// Direct Routing
route( "/render/:format" ).to( "actionRendering.index" );

// With Regex
route( "post/:postID-regex:([a-zA-Z]+?)/:userID-alpha/regex:(xml|json)" )
	.to( "ehGeneral.dumpRC" );

// subdomain routing
route( "/" )
	.withDomain( ":username.forgebox.dev" )
	.to( "subdomain.show" );

// Responses + Conditions
route( "/ff" )
	.withCondition( function(){
		return ( findnocase( "Firefox", cgi.HTTP_USER_AGENT ) ? true : false );
	} )
	.toResponse( "Hello FireFox" );
route( "/luis/:lname" )
	.toResponse( "<h1>Hi Luis {lname}, how are {you}</h1>", 200, "What up dude!" );

// Inline Closure Responses
route( "/luis2/:lname" )
	.toResponse( function( event, rc, prc ){
		return "<h1>Hello from closure land: #arguments.rc.lname#</h1>";
	} );

// Views No Events
route( "contactus" )
	.as( "contactUs")
	.toView( "simpleView" );

// Named routes
route( pattern="/routeRunner/:id/:name", name="routeRunner" )
	.to( "main.returnTest" );

// Grouped Routing
group( { pattern="/runAWNsync", handler="utilities.AWNsync" }, function( options ){
	route( '/:user_id' )
		.withAction( { get = "runAWNsync", options = "returnOptions" } )
		.end();
} );

// RESTFul Actions
route( "/health_check" )
	.withAction( { get = "runCheck", options = "returnOptions" } )
	.to( "utilities.HealthCheck" );

RESTful URLs 
ColdBox allows for the easy creation of RESTful URLs via URL mappings and extension detection.  Natively ColdBox can detect any extension when supplied to a URI resource:

http://api.coldbox.org/rest/user/luis.json
http://api.coldbox.org/rest/user/luis.xml
http://api.coldbox.org/rest/user/luis.pdf
http://api.coldbox.org/rest/user/luis.yml

It allows for detecting such extensions, security around them, and the ability to customize them.

Ajax support 
ColdBox supports all JavaScript frameworks that provide Ajax capabilities.  It also offers an auto-marshaling function for natively rendering objects to the following formats: XML, WDDX, JSON, JSONP, TEXT, PDF, and CUSTOM.

SOAP-Adobe Flex/Air support 
ColdBox supports creating, monitoring, and developing SOAP web services and Flex/Air remote components.  It allows for having one development paradigm for multiple GUI interfaces.

Documentation Links 
ColdBox MVC
WireBox Dependency Injection
CacheBox
LogBox

External links
Official site
GitHub code repository
Online API
ForgeBox - community based code sharing
Community Forums

References 

Web frameworks
CFML programming language